The Mayor of Thessaloniki is the head of the Municipality of Thessaloniki, the most populated municipality in the Thessaloniki Urban Area and centre of the urban area, which makes up the "City of Thessaloniki".

The current mayor of the city is Konstantinos Zervas, elected into office at the municipal elections of May 2019.

History
Ottoman period
 Suleyman Sudi Bey (1869)
 Anchiach Effendi (1870)
 Ahmed Rauf (1871-1874)
 Mehmet Pasha (1874)
 Faik Bey (1875)
 Mehmet Tefik (1876)
 Akif Bey (1877)
 Arif Bey (1878-1880)
 Shukri Bey (1880-1882)
 Ali Orfi Effendi (1882)
 Ali Effendi Musa Zade (1882-1884)
 Ali Effendi (1884)
 Arif Bey (1885)
 Ibrahim Bey (1886-1889)
 Ibrahim Namik Bey (1889-1893)
  (1893-1895)
 Reis Bekili Kerim Bey (1895-1897)
 Reis Bekili Hasan Husni Effendi (1897-1901)
 Ahmed Hamdi Bey (1901-1907)
 Tevfik Bey (1907)
 Ahmed Hamdi Bey (1907-1908)
 Osman Adil Bey (1908)
 Hulusi Bey (1908)
 Osman Said Ibn Haki Bey (1908-1909)
 Ismail Effendi (1909-1910)
 Tevfik Bey (1910-1912)

Modern period
  (1912-1916)
 Konstantinos Aggelakis (18 August 1916 – 15 November 1920)
 Osman Said Bey (15 November 1920 – 22 September 1922)
 Athanasios Kallidopoulos (22 Σεπτεμβρίου 1922-8 Δεκεμβρίου 1922)
  (1922 – 1926)
 Georgios Zaroukas (20 June 1926 – 28 February 1926)
 Minas Patrikios (1926-1929) with pauses due to dictatorial persecutions - dismissed by the dictatorial regime of Theodoros Pangalos
  (August 1929-19 October 1930)
Charisios Vamvakas (1931-1933)
  (1934-1 April 1936)
  (1 April 1937 – 22 February 1943) appointed by the dictatorial regime 1937-41 and then by the Nazi authorities 1941-43.
 George Seremetis (23 February 1943 – 28 October 1944) appointed by the Nazi authorities.
  (November 1944-January 1945)
 Petros Levis (28 February 1945 – 29 May 1946)
 Christos Konstantinou (29 May 1946 – 23 August 1950)
 Ioannis Manesis (23 August 1950 – 7 June 1951)
 Aristi Pagiataki (June 1, 1951-7 June 1951), The first elected Mayor in the 1951 elections - she was dismissed and became a simple municipal councilor after a legal appeal of Petrakakis (who was elected 2nd) due to a vague law for women mayors.
 Pantelis Petrakakis (1951-1955), Second in votes in the 1951 elections - he was sworn in after Pagiataki's dismissal following his own legal appeal.
 Minas Patrikios (1956-1959)
  (1959-1964)
 Konstantinos Tsiros (1964-1967)
 Vyron Antoniadis (5 August 1967 – 12 April 1968) appointed by dictatorial regime
 Alexandros Konstantinidis (12 April 1968 – 8 February 1970) appointed by dictatorial regime
 Christos Floridis (8 February 1970 – 30 August 1974) appointed by dictatorial regime
  (caretaker) (30 August 1974 – 24 September 1974)
 Stergios Vallas (judge, caretaker) (24 September 1974 – 1 June 1975)
 Michalis Papadopoulos (1 June 1975-January 1982)
 Kostis Moskof (caretaker) (6 February 1982 – 17 February 1982)
 Athanasios Giannousis (17 February 1982 – 31 December 1982)
 Theocharis Manavis (1 January 1983 – 31 December 1986)
 Sotiris Kouvelas (1 January 1987 – 18 June 1989) He resigned
 Konstantinos Kosmopoulos (18 June 1989 – 19 March 1998) He resigned
 Dimitris Dimitriadis (19 March 1998 – 31 December 1998)
 Vasilios Papageorgopoulos (1 January 1999 – 31 December 2010)
 Yiannis Boutaris (1 January 2011 – 31 August 2019)
 Konstantinos Zervas (1 September 2019 – Incumbent)

Sources 
 

Thessaloniki
Mayors of Thessaloniki